Montescudo is a frazione and former comune (municipality) in the Province of Rimini in the Italian region Emilia-Romagna, located about  southeast of Bologna and about  south of Rimini.

Montescudo borders the following municipalities: Coriano, Faetano (San Marino), Gemmano, Monte Colombo, Sassofeltrio.

History
Montescudo is most likely of Etruscan origin. Likely from Italian monte ("mountain") + scudo ("shield"), thus ("shield mountain"). In the Roman era it was a station of the military mail service from Rimini to Rome. In 1209 it was conquered by Emperor Otto I, and later was under the Republic of Venice. In the late Middle Ages, through a series of bloody struggles, it was contended by the House of Malatesta of Rimini and by the Dukes of Urbino. In 1509 it was ceded by the Republic of Venice to the Papal States.

On 1 January 2016 Montescudo merged Monte Colombo to form the new municipality of Montescudo-Monte Colombo.

Main sights
Civic Tower (14th century)
Remains of the walls erected by Sigismondo Pandolfo Malatesta, as well as of a Rocca Malatestiana (castle).
The Ghiacciaia, an ice reservoir dating from the Malatestian era.
Remains of the 15th century church of Santa Maria Succurrente, in the frazione of Valliano.

References

External links
 Official website

Former municipalities of Emilia-Romagna
Frazioni of the Province of Rimini
Cities and towns in Emilia-Romagna